Kassi is a village in Viljandi Parish, Viljandi County, Estonia.

References

Villages in Viljandi County